This article contains a list of theaters in Minnesota.

Theatre list
 (Lumin) Theater Lab
 20% Theatre Company Twin Cities
 4 Community Theatre
 8 Ball Theatre
 A Center for the Arts
 ABC Theater Company
 Absolute Theatre
 Actors Theater of Minnesota
 Aktion Club Theatre
 Albert Lea Community Theater (ACT)
 Andria Theatre (Previously Alexandria Area Arts Association)
 Amboy Area Community Theater
 American Shakespeare Repertory
 An Alleged Theatre Company
 Ananya Dance Theatre
 Anoka Community Theatre
 Appleseed Community Theatre
 Arbeit Opera Theatre
 Arena Dances
 Artistry
 Arts Nest
 Ashland Productions
 Asylum Theatre
 At the Foot of the Mountain Theater
 Augsburg University Theater
 Ballet of the Dolls
 Bard Shakes
 Barn Bar Theater
 Bearded Company
 Bemidji Community Theatre
 Benilde-St. Margaret's School Drama Department
 Bethany Lutheran College Theatre Department
 Black Dirt Theater
 Blackout Improv
 Blue Earth Readers Workshop
 Blue Earth Town and Country Players
 Blue Mounds Area Theatre
 Blue Water Theatre Company
 Brave New Workshop
 Bryant-Lake Bowl
 Chanhassen Dinner Theatres
 Children's Theatre Company
Classical Actors Ensemble
 Commonweal Theatre Company
 Emigrant Theater
 Fitzgerald Theater
 Frank Theatre
 Green T Productions
 Gremlin Theatre
 Guthrie Theater
 Hardcover Theater
 Hennepin Center for the Arts
 History Theatre
 HUGE Improv Theater
 In the Heart of the Beast Puppet and Mask Theatre
 InterAct Theatre Company
 Illusion Theater
 Joking Apart Theater
 Jungle Theater
 Loring Playhouse
 Live Action Set
 Lundstrum Center for the Performing Arts
 Minneapolis Theatre Garage
 Minnesota Association of Community Theatres (MACT)
 Minnesota Dance Theatre
 Minnesota Fringe Festival
 Minnesota Jewish Theatre Company
 Minnesota Opera
 Mixed Blood Theatre
 Mounds Theatre
 Mu Performing Arts
 Nautilus Music-Theater
 Off-Leash
 Old Log Theater
 Ordway Center for the Performing Arts
 Pangea World Theater
 Pantages Theatre
 Park Square Theatre
 Pence Opera House in Minneapolis, 1867 - 1952
 Penumbra Theatre Company
 Punchinello Players
 Ragamala Dance Company
 Rarig Center at the University of Minnesota (four theaters)
 Really Spicy Opera
 Red Eye Theater
 Sandbox Theatre
 Shakespearean Youth Theatre
 Skewed Visions
 The Southern Theater
 Stages Theatre Company
 Starting Gate Productions
 State Theatre (Minneapolis)
 SteppingStone Theatre
 Ten Thousand Things
 The Chameleon Theatre Circle
 The Historic Orpheum Theatre
 The Open Window Theatre
 Palace Theater (Luverne, Minnesota)
 The Playwrights' Center
 The Southern Theater
 Theatre de la Jeune Lune
 Theatre in the Round Players (TRP)
 Theatre L'homme Dieu
 Theater Latte Da
 Top Hat Theatre
 Torch Theater
 Umbrella Collective
 Urban Samurai Productions
 Varsity Theater
 Walking Shadow Theatre Company
 Workhouse Theatre Company
 Yellow Tree Theatre
 Youth Performance Company

Theater awards
Ivey Awards

Further reading

References

Minnesota culture

Minnesota
Theaters